Chaisang District, known as Jiujiang County before September 2017, is a district of the city of Jiujiang in Jiangxi Province, China. It has non-contiguous land area, with a smaller exclave to the northeast being separated by Lianxi District and Xunyang District.

History
During the Three Kingdoms era, Chaisang was a stronghold in the Eastern Wu state.

Administrative divisions
Chaisang District is divided to 3 subdistricts, 5 towns and 4 townships.
3 subdistricts
 Shahe
 Shizi
 Chengmen

5 towns

4 townships

References

External links

County-level divisions of Jiangxi
Jiujiang